The following is a list of all suspensions and fines enforced in the National Hockey League (NHL) during the 2020–21 NHL season. It lists which players or coaches of what team have been punished for which offense and the amount of punishment they have received. The season was shortened to 56 games featuring exclusively intra-division play due to the COVID-19 pandemic. No pre-season games were played.

Players' money forfeited due to suspension or fine goes to the Players' Emergency Assistance Fund, while money forfeited by coaches, staff or organizations as a whole goes to the NHL Foundation.

Suspensions
Based on each player's average annual salary, divided by number of days in the season (116) for non-repeat offenders and games (56) for repeat offenders, salary will be forfeited for the term of their suspension.

† - suspension covered at least one 2021 postseason game
 - Player was considered a repeat offender under the terms of the Collective Bargaining Agreement (player had been suspended in the 18 months prior to this suspension)

Notes
1. All figures are in US dollars.
2. While no longer serving in a capacity with the team, the NHL ruled that Chayka's July 26, 2020 departure as general manager of the Arizona Coyotes breached his obligation to the club, by pursuing other opportunities while under contract. Chayka's suspension forbids him from working for any NHL club, in any capacity, through December 31, 2021.
3. Suspension was appealed by Kadri on May 23, 2021. On May 31, 2021, NHL Commissioner Gary Bettman announced he had heard the appeal and was upholding the original 8 game suspension levied to Kadri. The NHLPA then appealed to a neutral arbitrator on behalf of Kadri, on the same day. On June 8, 2021, NHL/NHLPA Neutral Discipline Arbitrator, Shyam Das, upheld the NHL's 8-game suspension.
4. As the Winnipeg Jets were eliminated from the playoffs, the remaining game of Scheifele's suspension was instead made to be served in his first game of the 2021–22 NHL season.

Fines
Players can be fined up to 50% of one day's salary, up to a maximum of $10,000.00 for their first offense, and $15,000.00 for any subsequent offenses (player had been fined in the 12 months prior to this fine). Coaches, non-playing personnel, and teams are not restricted to such maximums, though can still be treated as repeat offenders.

Fines for players/coaches fined for diving/embellishment are structured uniquely and are only handed out after non-publicized warnings are given to the player/coach for their first offense. For more details on diving/embellishment fines:

 For coach incident totals, each citation issued to a player on his club counts toward his total.
 All figures are in US dollars.

Fines listed in italics indicate that was the maximum allowed fine.

Notes
1. All figures are in US dollars.
2. The San Jose Sharks were also assessed a conditional fine of $25,000 that would be assessed in the event of similar inappropriate behavior through March 22, 2022.
3. Barzal was issued his first citation following an incident on January 30, 2021.
4. Rantanen was issued his first citation following an incident on March 23, 2021.
5. It was reported on June 4, 2021 that Rantanen's diving/embellishment fine had been rescinded by the NHL following an appeal by Rantanen.

Further reading

See also 
 2019–20 NHL suspensions and fines
 2021–22 NHL suspensions and fines
 2020 in sports
 2021 in sports
 2020–21 NHL season
 2020–21 NHL transactions

References

External links
NHL Collective Bargaining Agreement
NHLPA, NHL Announce 2020-21 Medical Protocols, Transition Rules and Approval of a Change to NHL Rule 83

Suspension and Fines
National Hockey League suspensions and fines